James Freeborough (13 February 1879 – 1961) was an English footballer who played as a full back for Stockport County, Leeds City and Bradford Park Avenue as well as non-league football for various other clubs.

References 

English footballers
Stockport County F.C. players
Tottenham Hotspur F.C. players
Leeds City F.C. players
Bradford (Park Avenue) A.F.C. players
Rochdale A.F.C. players
Macclesfield Town F.C. players
Denton F.C. players
1879 births
1961 deaths